Allameh Mohammad-Taqi Ja'fari (15 August 1925 – 16 November 1998) was an Iranian scholar, philosopher, intellectual, and islamic theologist. Ja'fari was a Shia philosopher and thinker in the recent time. He was expert in various fields such as history, logic, metaphysics, philosophy, literature, mysticism, jurisprudence, and philosophy of science.

Biography 
Mohammad-Taki Ja'fari was born on 1923 in Tabriz, Iran. He graduated from elementary studies in Tabriz and continued his education in the Talebieh Seminary. Mohammad-Taghi then went to Qom and Tehran Seminaries for benefiting from religious scholars of the time. Thereafter he left Iran for 11 years to attend the School of Theology in Najaf. He achieved his Ijtihad degree when he was 23 years old. Ja'fari returned to Iran and taught in Qom and Tehran.

Works 
   Interpretation and Criticism of Rumi's Masnavi (15 volumes)
   Translation and Interpretation of the Nahj al-Balagha (27 volumes)
   Pioneer Culture to the Rescue of Mankind
   The Mystery of Life
   The Conscience
   Positive Mysticism
   Imam Hossein's Prayers at the Arafat Desert (Arabic)
   The Coordination between Science & Religion (Arabic)
   The Conscience
   Religion and Moral Ethics
   Mabda' A'ala
   From One Sea to Another (An Index to the Mathnavi, 4 volumes)
   Three Poets – Hafiz, Sa'di and Nizami
   An Analysis of Khayyam's Personality
   An Interpretation, Review and Analysis of Rumi's Mathnavi
   Rumi and Ideologies
   What Makes Rumi's Words So Fascinating
   The Relationship between Man and the Universe
   Ideals of Life and the Ideal Life
   Philosophy and Aim of Life
   Man and Creation
   Man in Elevating, Evolution Life
   Man Seen in the Koran
   Motion and change as seen in the koran
   A Study and Critique of David Hume's Thoughts on Four Philosophical Issues
   A Study and Critique of the Russell-Wyatt Dialog
   A Study and Critique of Selected Thoughts of Bertrand Russell
   A Study and Critique of The Adventures of Ideas
   Human Rights from Islamic and Western Viewpoints
   Islam's Political Philosophy
   Mysticism and Gnostics
   Positive Mysticism
   A Legal and Jurisprudential Study of the Human Genome Project
   Speculative (Systematic) Theology and Its Modern Forms
   Fatalism and Free Will
   The Philosophy of Religion
   Jurisprudential Sources
   Al-reza'a
   Worship and Wisdom in Islamic Jurisprudence
   Ta'avon –uddin val-elm
   Nahayat-ol-edrak al-vaqe'ee bain-ol-phalsafat-ol-qadima va al-hadisa
   A Study of the Philosophy of Science
   Science and Religion in Reasonable Life
   Recognition and Knowledge Seen in Science and the Koran
   Al-amr Bain-ol-amrain
   Fatalism and Free Will
   The Philosophy of Religion
   Imam Hossein's Prayers at the Arafat Desert
   Imam Hossein, the Martyr of Human Pioneer Culture
   A Complete Translation of the Nahj-ol-balaqeh
   The Exploration of Thoughts (2 volumes)
   In Presence of Wisdom
   Reasonable Life
   A Compilation of Articles
   The Message of Wisdom
   Pioneer Culture to the Rescue of Mankind
   The Mystery of Life
   A Plan for Cultural Revolution

Death 
Mohammad-Taqi Ja'fari died in London on 16 November 1998 and was buried in Mashhad in the vicinity of Imam Reza Shrine.

References 

Iranian Shia scholars of Islam
Iranian Shia clerics
Iranian translators
20th-century Muslim theologians
People from Tabriz
1925 births
1998 deaths
20th-century translators
Recipients of the Order of Knowledge
20th-century Iranian philosophers
Burials in Mashhad
Rumi scholars